Pinocchio is a 2019 fantasy film, co-written, directed, and co-produced by Matteo Garrone, based on the 1883 book The Adventures of Pinocchio by Italian author Carlo Collodi. The film stars child actor Federico Ielapi as the title character, Roberto Benigni as Geppetto, Gigi Proietti as Mangiafuoco, Rocco Papaleo and Massimo Ceccherini as the Cat and the Fox, and Marine Vacth as the adult Fairy with Turquoise Hair. This was the final film featuring Proietti to be released before his death in November 2020.

Pinocchio was a passion project for Garrone, who drew the first storyboard of the story at the age of six. Unlike previous Garrone films, which were directed towards adults, Pinocchio is aimed at both adults and children. Most characters, including Pinocchio himself, were created through prosthetic make-up rather than CG. It is the second live-action Pinocchio film to star Benigni, following the 2002 adaptation, and the second to star Papaleo, after the 2012 animated film.

The film was released in Italy on 19 December 2019, by 01 Distribution, and grossed €15 million domestically, making it the highest-grossing film of the Christmas week in Italy, as well as Garrone's highest-grossing film domestically (beating 2008's Gomorrah), and the sixth highest-grossing film in Italy of 2019–20. An English-dubbed version was released by Vertigo Films in the United Kingdom and Ireland on 14 August 2020, and by Roadside Attractions in the United States and Canada on 25 December 2020.

Pinocchio was met with positive reviews from critics. It received 15 nominations at the 2020 David di Donatello Awards, winning five: Best Sets and Decorations, Best Costumes, Best Makeup, Best Hair Design and Best Visual Effects. It was also nominated for nine Nastro d'Argento Awards, winning six, plus a special mention, and two Academy Award nominations for Best Costume Design and Best Makeup and Hairstyling at the 93rd Academy Awards.

Plot
A poor Italian carpenter named Geppetto decides to build a wooden puppet to tour the country and earn him a living. He names it "Pinocchio". When the puppet becomes sentient, he calls it his son. A Talking Cricket tries to help Pinocchio by giving him advice, but Pinocchio disregards it and burns his feet off by accident when resting near the fireplace. Geppetto promises him new feet on the condition that Pinocchio goes to school.

Pinocchio sets off to school, but is distracted by the puppet theatre. In the theater, he joins the other living puppets and messes up the show. Furious that his production went upstream, Mangiafuoco locks Pinocchio in his caravan and leaves town. Pinocchio begs to return to his father and Mangiafuoco lets him go, choosing to burn another puppet for firewood in his place. Pinocchio is upset by this and chooses to take the puppet's place. Surprised by his sacrifice, Mangiafuoco releases Pinocchio and gives him five gold coins to give to Geppetto.

On his way home, Pinocchio meets a fox and a cat pretending to be disabled (the Fox being lame and the Cat going blind). Attracted by the coins, they suggest that Pinocchio should try to sow them so they will sprout into a tree of money in the Field of Miracles, located in the Land of the Barn Owl. The Cat and the Fox trick him and disguise themselves as hooded assassins. Pinocchio hides the coins and attempts to flee but is caught and hung from a tree. He is rescued by a little girl, The Fairy with Turquoise Hair, who asks him why he was not at home or in school. Embarrassed, Pinocchio lies and his nose becomes bigger with each lie until the Fairy is forced to shorten his nose.

Having learned his lesson, Pinocchio returns home only to meet the Fox and the Cat a second time. Seeing that their plan failed, they convince him to go to the Field of Miracles again. Upon arriving, he plants the coins which the Fox and the Cat steal. Discovering the theft, Pinocchio reports it to the gorilla judge. Since justice does not favor the innocent in Barn Owl, he is sentenced to life. Pinocchio manages to get exonerated by telling the judge that he committed a crime before, making him guilty, and thus he is released.

Pinocchio returns home, but learns from one of the neighbors that Geppetto has left to look for him overseas in North America. Pinocchio swims into the sea to find him, but gets shipwrecked on the Island of the Busy Bees. He is saved by the Blue Fairy (now a grown adult), who promises to turn him into a real boy if he studies and behaves.

Pinocchio goes to school and becomes the most studious boy in his class. During his time there however, he befriends Lucignolo, a disobedient boy who invites him to come to the Land of Toys where children can have fun all day long without schools, rules or adults while being taken their by The Coachman. After a long day in the Land of Toys, Pinocchio wakes up with donkey ears and finds Lucignolo has the same problem—they are turning into donkeys.

The Coachman sells them and with Pinocchio being sold to a circus. One day, Pinocchio notices the Fairy in the audience, trips, and cripples himself. The ringmaster decides to drown him and use his skin for a drum. In the sea, the Fairy summons fishes that nibble away Pinocchio's donkey skin, bringing him back to normal.

Pinocchio once again swims in search for his father and is swallowed by a gigantic ravenous whale-like sea monster. He finds Geppetto alive inside the monster. Taking advantage of the sea monster's asthma which forces him to sleep with his mouth open, the two flee from his mouth and reach the shore with the help of a big friendly Tuna.

They find an abandoned house to rest in. To heal his father, who has gotten sick from the trip, Pinocchio is hired by a farmer to earn milk. Pinocchio continues to work and study and help Geppetto while he recovers, Pinocchio once again meets the Fox and Cat who actually gained their specific disabilities. They want his earnings, but Pinocchio learned from his past mistakes and states that it serves them right. The Fairy then grants Pinocchio his wish. He returns home and shows Geppetto that he has become a real boy.

Cast

Production

On 24 October 2016, it was announced that Toni Servillo was cast as Pinocchio's father Geppetto. Two years later, in October 2018, it was announced that Geppetto would be played by Roberto Benigni (who had played Pinocchio in a previous adaptation directed by himself) who said "A great character, a great story, a great director: playing Geppetto directed by Matteo Garrone is one of the forms of happiness."

Nick Dudman was initially announced as working on the film, but later dropped out. Mark Coulier created the character design, prosthetics and special make-up for the film.

Filming began on 18 March 2019 for 11 weeks in Tuscany, at Tenuta La Fratta, Lazio and Apulia.

Release
The film was theatrically released in Italy on 19 December 2019.

English dub
Garrone paid €150,000 out of his own pocket to dub the movie in English before even finding a distributor. He chose to use Italian voices to preserve the Italianness of the film, and to take advantage of the fact that Italians are master dubbers. Three actors dubbed themselves: Federico Ielapi as Pinocchio, Alida Baldari Calabria as the child Fairy and Maurizio Lombardi as the Tuna; Lombardi also dubbed another character, Doctor Raven (played by Massimiliano Gallo). The adult fairy, played by Marine Vacth, is dubbed again by Domitilla D'Amico, who had already dubbed her in the Italian version. The dub was directed by Francesco Vairano, who also wrote the English dialogue.

In May 2020, one of the movie's producers, said they were very close to selling Pinocchio to the US, but the coronavirus outbreak put the selling on hiatus. On July 27, that same year, it was announced that Vertigo Films had bought the UK and Ireland rights to the film, with plans to theatrically release it in late August. On July 28, the British Board of Film Classification gave the film a PG rating. On July 30, Vertigo published the English trailer, and revealed that the movie would be released in UK and Ireland on August 14, with previews from August 10.

On November 19, 2020, it was announced that Roadside Attractions had bought the US rights to the film. On November 30, it was revealed that the English version of the movie would be released in the United States and Canada on December 25.

Marketing
On 29 March 2019, the first promotional image was released. The first trailer was published online on July 3, 2019.

Reception

Box office
Pinocchio grossed $30.4 million, including $17.8 million in Italy, against a production budget of €11 million.

In Italy, the film made US$2.9 million in its opening weekend, finishing second behind Star Wars: The Rise of Skywalker. It made $1.9 million in its second weekend and $530,806 in its third, finishing third and sixth, respectively. The film grossed €15 million ($17.1 million) domestically, making it director Garrone's highest-grossing film domestically (beating 2008's Gomorrah, which made €10.2 million). It was also the sixth highest-grossing film in Italy in the 2019–2020 season (behind Tolo Tolo, The Lion King, Joker, Frozen II and Il primo Natale).

In the film's United Kingdom debut it grossed $140,810 (£107,260) from 271 theaters, becoming the third highest-grossing film since the British cinemas' re-opening from the COVID-19 pandemic. It went on to gross $1.1 million in the UK. In the United States, the film debuted to $274,600 from 736 theaters.

Critical response
The site's critics consensus reads: "Sticking closely to Carlo Collodi's original story, Matteo Garrone's Pinocchio pulls every string to create a visually stunning film that proves that some tales really are timeless." Metacritic reports a weighted average score of 65 out of 100 based on 11 critics, indicating "generally favorable reviews".

Deborah Young of The Hollywood Reporter wrote: 'Matteo Garrone's new Pinocchio brings genuine emotion to one of the most ambitious film adaptations to date of Carlo Collodi's 1883 kid classic.' Eric Kohn of IndieWire gave it a B rating and wrote: "Pinocchio imbues its circumstances with a surprising degree of naturalism, thanks to the filmmaker's careful handling of practical effects that suit the unusual tone." Peter Bradshaw of The Guardian gave it 4/5 stars, saying: "Pinocchio is a thoroughly bizarre story; Garrone makes of it a weirdly satisfying spectacle." Simran Hans of The Observer also gave the movie 4/5 stars, stating that: "The source material is a neat fit for the Italian film-maker, who traversed similarly episodic fairytale terrain with 2015's Tale of Tales. It's also a critique of society that feels timeless or, rather, timely – and not just for Garrone". Josefine Algieri of OneRoomwithaView.com wrote, "Pinocchio is still an enjoyable film, boasting an appropriately whimsical score and beautiful production design, and succeeds in creating a fairy tale even among the realism of poverty-stricken rural Italy."

At the Berlinale film festival 2020, the critics' consensus read that the film suffered from its own sense of realism and quickly bores due to its lack of fairy tale flair, but Begnini's scurrilous performance might occasionally provoke a tired laugh.

Accolades

Notes

References

External links
 

Films directed by Matteo Garrone
Films shot in Italy
Pinocchio films
Italian fantasy films
Italian children's films
Films scored by Dario Marianelli
HanWay Films films
Vertigo Films films
Recorded Picture Company films